Arthur Stevens may refer to:

 Arthur Stevens (Australian footballer) (1899–1953), Australian rules footballer for Footscray
 Arthur Stevens (English footballer) (1921–2007), association footballer for Fulham
 Arthur Edwin Stevens (1905–1995), Welsh inventor

See also
 Arthur Stephens, footballer